Łukasz Wolsztyński (born 8 December 1994) is a Polish professional footballer who plays as an attacking midfielder for Kotwica Kołobrzeg. He is the twin brother of Rafał Wolsztyński.

In 2012, Wolsztyński signed for Górnik Zabrze. In 2015, he was loaned to Limanovia Limanowa. The following year, he went on loan to Legionovia Legionowo before coming back to the club and making successive appearances both in the starting line-up and off the bench in the following seasons.

References

External links
 
 

1994 births
Living people
Polish footballers
Poland youth international footballers
People from Gliwice County
Association football forwards
Górnik Zabrze players
Limanovia Limanowa players
Arka Gdynia players
Chojniczanka Chojnice players
Kotwica Kołobrzeg footballers
Ekstraklasa players
I liga players
II liga players
III liga players